Harvey William Rew (born 25 September 2002) is an English  footballer who plays for Gosport Borough as either a centre-back or a left-back.

Club career

Portsmouth
Rew progressed through Pompey's youth categories. On 2 October 2019, Rew signed a 2-year professional contract with Portsmouth with the club holding an option for a further year. 

Rew made his Portsmouth debut in a 2-2 draw (5-4 penalty win) vs Oxford on 8 October 2019 in the EFL Trophy. Rew played the first 45 minutes of the game in the central midfield position.

International career
Rew is eligible to represent both England and Wales at international level.

Career statistics

References

External links
Portsmouth FC profile

2002 births
Living people
Welsh footballers
Wales youth international footballers
Association football defenders
Portsmouth F.C. players
Footballers from Portsmouth